The name of the ministry was changed in 2022 by the Ministry of Agriculture, Food and Forestry to the Ministry of Agriculture.

The Ministry of Agriculture, (Ministerstvo na zemedelieto) of Bulgaria is the ministry charged with regulating agriculture and forestry in the country. It was founded as the Ministry of Agriculture and State Property on 24 July 1911, when it was separated from the Ministry of Commerce and Agriculture.

It was created by the Tarnovo Constitution.

History of the Ministry 
The history of today's Ministry of Agriculture and Foods starts back in 1879, when in pursuance of Article 161 of the Constitution, as adopted by the Founding National Assembly in Veliko Tarnovo provided for the establishment of seven ministries, including the ministry of common buildings, agriculture and trade. After vehement discussions the first National Assembly voted that the number of the ministries will be six, whereas the ministry of common buildings, agriculture and trade, in the words of Petko Karavelov, "will integrate as it may be proper". Thus, in pursuance of Decree No.23 of 9 August 1879, the administration of the agricultural affairs in the Principality of Bulgaria was put under the helm of the Ministry of Finance, which forms an internal unit for state property along with raw materials. Its sub-governor was appointed to be Ivan Dimov Goshev.

In pursuance of Decree No.463 of 1882, there is a second attempt to found the ministry of common buildings, agriculture and trade, but two and a half years later its functions are terminated on the grounds of being incompliant with the superimposing provisions of the Tarnovo Constitution.

The Fourth Great National Assembly suggested an amendment to the Tarnovo Constitution with regard also to Article 161 defining the number of the Bulgarian ministries. Hence, issue 107 of the State Gazette dated 25 May 1893 promulgates Proclamation of Tsar Ferdinand to the Bulgarian People for the establishment of the first legal Ministry of Trade and Agriculture. In pursuance of Decree No.5 dated 19 November 1893, Panayot Slavkov was appointed its first minister. Immediately after stepping into office, Minister Slavkov submitted for consideration at the National Assembly 2 bills – the first planning the funds required for the structural organization of the Ministry of Trade and Agriculture, and the second bill that provided for the allotment of interest-free to poor farmers and farms suffering from hailstorm. The competences of the newly established the Ministry of Trade and Agriculture cover the majority of national economic sectors, such as agriculture, cattle breeding, forests, waters, mines, crafts, industry, domestic and international trade, professional agricultural and crafts schools.

In 1895 the ministry indulged also with social policy, by forming agricultural funds whose administration and management is in the hands of the ministry itself. After the establishment of the Bulgarian Agricultural Bank in 1904, the ministry takes on the control and supervision on the bank's activities as well.

With the amendment of the Tarnovo Constitution in 1911, the Ministry of Trade and Agriculture is closed and replaced with the Ministry of Agriculture and State Property. It was headed by Dimitar Hristov, the last minister of the previous Ministry of Trade and Agriculture. The organizational structure of the new ministry includes 6 directorates – agriculture, veterinary, forests, hunting and fishing, waters and state property.

Building 
Remains of a three-nave church from the 5th century with dimensions of 35 × 20 meters and a small necropolis around it have been discovered on the site of today's building of the Ministry of Agriculture.

The Ministry of Agriculture is housed in a building with Baroque architecture on 55 Hristo Botev Blvd. from 1944, designed by the Bulgarian architect Nikola Lazarov. The competition for the building of the District Palace dates back to 1912, but due to the wars the building was completed only in 1927. Today it is a cultural asset.

Until 1944, the District Chamber of the Kingdom of Bulgaria was located there and all district services were gathered in one place: the District Audit Office, the District Administration, the District Medical and Veterinary Physicians, the District Engineers and Architects, the District School Inspectors, the District Control Bureau and weights. In addition to them, the building houses the Standing Committee with its offices: Technical-School, Water Supply and Planning, the Directorate of Statistics, Forestry and the Regional Forestry Inspector.

In 1971 - 1975 a new one was built behind the old building, glued to the old one by means of an adapter-corridor.

List of formers Ministers of agriculture 1969–2009
industry – Valkan Shopov –  December 1969 – October 1973
industry – Gancho Krastev – October 1973 – April 1978
industry – Grigor Stoichkov – April 1978 – April 1979
Minister president of Nacional agrarianidustri union (NAIU) – Vasil Canov – April 1979 – May 1981
Minister president of NAIU – Aleksander Petkov – May 1981 – March 1986
Minister of agriculture and forestry – Alexi Ivanov – March 1986 – December 1988
Minister of agriculture and forestry – Georgi Menov – December 1988 – February 1990
industry – Todor Pandov – February – December 1990
Minister of agriculture – Boris Spirov – December 1990 – November 1991
Minister of agriculture – Stanislav Dimitrov – November 1991 – May 1992
Minister of agricultural development – Georgi Stoianov – May – December 1992
Minister of agriculture – Georgi Tanev – December 1992 – October 1994
Minister of agriculture – Rumen Hristov – October 1994 – January 1995
industry – Vasil Chichibaba – January 1995 – January 1996
industry – Svetoslav Shivarov – January – June 1996
industry – Krastio Trendafilov – June 1996 – February 1997
– Rumen Hristov – February – May 1997
Minister of agriculture and forestry – Vencislav Varbanov – May 1997 – July 2001
Minister of agriculture and forestry – Mehmet Dikme – July 2001 – February 2005
Minister of agriculture and forestry and food supply – Nihat Kabil – February 2005 – April 2008
– Valeri Cvetanov – April 2008 – July 2009
- Miroslav Naydenov - July 2009 - March 2013
- Ivan Stankov - March 2013 - May 2013
- Dimitar Grekov - May 2013- August 2014
- Vasil Grudev - August 2014 -  November 2014
Minister of agriculture and forestry and food - Desislava Taneva - November 2014 - January 2017
Minister of agriculture and forestry and food - Hristo  Bozukov - January 2017 - May 2017
Minister of agriculture and forestry and food - Rumen Porozhanov - May 2017 - May 2019
Minister of agriculture and forestry and food - Desislava Taneva - May 2019 - May 2021
Minister of agriculture and forestry and food - Hristo  Bozukov - May 2021 - September 2021
Minister of agriculture and forestry and food - Hristo  Bozukov - September 2021 - December 2021
Minister of agriculture - Ivan Ivanov - December 2021 -

Structure 

 Inspectorate
 Financial controllers
 Internal Audit Directorate
 Monitoring, Coordination and Control Directorate of the Paying Agency
 General administration
 Human Resources Directorate
 Legal Affairs and Legislation Directorate of the European Union
 Finance and Property Management Directorate
 Economic Activities, Investments and Hydromelioration Directorate
 Information and Communication Services Directorate
 Administrative Services Directorate
 Public Relations and Protocol Directorate
 Security Directorate
 Public Procurement Directorate
 Specialized administration
 Directorate General for Agriculture and Regional Policy
 Land Relations and Consolidation Directorate
 Trade Companies and State Enterprises Directorate
 Market Measures and Producers Organization Directorate
 Direct Payments Directorate
 Directorate for Identification of Agricultural Parcels
 Analysis and Strategic Planning Directorate
 State Aid and Regulations Directorate
 European Coordination and International Relations Directorate
 Rural Development Directorate
 Maritime Affairs and Fisheries Directorate
 Common Fisheries Policy Directorate
 Agri-Food Chain Policies Directorate
 Plant Breeding Directorate
 Organic Production Directorate
 Livestock Directorate

Agencies at the Ministry of Agriculture 

 Bulgarian Food Safety Agency

 Executive Forest Agency and relevant Regional Forest Directorates

References

External links
 Official website 

Agriculture and Food
Bulgaria
Bulgaria
Ministries established in 1911
1911 establishments in Bulgaria
Agricultural organizations based in Bulgaria